

Atwick is a village and civil parish in Holderness in the East Riding of Yorkshire, England.

The civil parish is formed by the village of Atwick and the hamlet of Skirlington. According to the 2011 UK census, Atwick parish had a population of 315, a slight reduction from the 2001 UK census figure of 318.

The name Atwick is pronounced with a silent 'w', like "attic".

Second World War
The Second World War defences constructed in and around Atwick have been documented by William Foot.  They included a heavy anti-aircraft battery and several pillboxes.

Folklore
According to legend, a spring near the church was once the home of a hobgoblin known as the Haliwell Boggle. The area is also said to be haunted by a headless horseman.

References

Further reading
 
 The Villages of the Yorkshire Wolds: Atwick

Villages in the East Riding of Yorkshire
Holderness
Civil parishes in the East Riding of Yorkshire
Populated coastal places in the East Riding of Yorkshire